The 1936 Tennessee gubernatorial election was held on November 3, 1936. Democratic nominee Gordon Browning defeated Republican nominee Pat H. Thach with 80.38% of the vote.

Primary elections
Primary elections were held on August 6, 1936.

Democratic primary

Candidates
Gordon Browning, former U.S. Representative
Burgin E. Dossett
C. W. Wright

Results

General election

Candidates
Major party candidates
Gordon Browning, Democratic
Pat H. Thach, Republican 

Other candidates
Kate Bradford Stockton, Independent

Results

References

1936
Tennessee
Gubernatorial